In chemistry, paratungstate refers to the anion with the formula [W12O42]12- and salts derived from this anion. The term also refers to protonated derivatives of this anion, including [H2W12O42]10-.  Ammonium paratungstate (or APT), (NH4)10[H2W12O42] is a key intermediate in the purification of tungsten from its ores.

The salt (NH4)10(W12O42)·4H2O has been characterized by X-ray crystallography. 

The unprotonated anion [W12O42]12- has C2h symmetry.

See also
 Metatungstate [W12O40]8-, with idealized Td symmetry.

References 

Tungstates
Transition metal oxyanions